Kim Il-woo (born June 19, 1963) is a South Korean actor.

Filmography

Television series

Film

Variety show

Awards and nominations

Actor

Entertainer

References

External links 
 
 
 
 

1963 births
Living people
South Korean male television actors
South Korean male film actors
Chung-Ang University alumni